Milad Safaei is an Iranian football midfielder who plays for Siah Jamegan in the Iran Pro League.

Club career
Safaei started his career with Astan Ghods Academy. He also had experiences in Kavosh, Persepolis Mashhad, Steel Azin, Payam Mashhad and Tarbiat Yazd academies. Vasei joined to Siah Jamegan in November 2011 and was part of the club in promotion to Azadegan League in 2013 and to Persian Gulf Pro League in 2015. He made his professional debut for Siah Jamegan on October 31, 2015 in 2-1 loss against Saipa as a substitute for Renan Silva.

Club career statistics

References

External links
 Milad Safaei at IranLeague.ir

1994 births
Living people
Iranian footballers
Siah Jamegan players
Association football midfielders